Eosinophilic cystitis is a rare condition where eosinophiles are present in the bladder wall. Signs and symptoms are similar to a bladder infection. Its cause is not entirely clear; however, may be linked to food allergies, infections, and medications among others.


Management
Treatment involves avoiding the trigger if that can be determined.

Prognosis
Long term outcomes in children are generally good.

References

Urological conditions